Martha Cecilia Márquez Alvarado (born 29 July 1984) is a Mexican politician. She has been a Senator for Aguascalientes from the Labor Party since 2018. She was re-elected in 2021. A graduate of the Autonomous University of Aguascalientes, she also served in the LXII Legislature of the Congress of Aguascalientes from 2013 to 2016.

References 

Living people
1984 births
Labor Party (Mexico) politicians
21st-century Mexican women politicians
21st-century Mexican politicians
Senators of the LXIV and LXV Legislatures of Mexico
Women members of the Chamber of Deputies (Mexico)
Members of the Chamber of Deputies (Mexico)
Politicians from Aguascalientes
Autonomous University of Aguascalientes alumni
Members of the Congress of Aguascalientes
Members of the Senate of the Republic (Mexico) for Aguascalientes
Women members of the Senate of the Republic (Mexico)